Megachile delphinensis is a species of bee in the family Megachilidae. It was described by Benoist in 1962.

References

Delphinensis
Insects described in 1962